The Los Angeles Amazons were a women's semi-professional American football team based in Los Angeles, California.  A member of the Women's Football Alliance, the Amazons played their home games at Miguel Contreras Learning Complex.

The Amazons previously played in the Women's Professional Football League from their inception in 2002 until 2007, the National Women's Football Association in 2008, and the Independent Women's Football League in 2009 and 2010.

Season-By-Season 

|-
| colspan="6" align="center" | Los Angeles Amazons (WPFL)
|-
|2002 || 1 || 8 || 0 || 5th American || --
|-
|2003 || 2 || 8 || 0 || 5th American West|| --
|-
|2004 || 4 || 6 || 0 || 3rd American West || --
|-
|2005 || 7 || 3 || 0 || 2nd American West || Lost American Conference Semifinal (So Cal)
|-
|2006 || 4 || 4 || 0 || 3rd American West || --
|-
|2007 || 7 || 1 || 0 || 1st American West || Lost American Conference Semifinal (So Cal)
|-
| colspan="6" align="center" | Los Angeles Amazons (NWFA)
|-
|2008 || 8 || 0 || 0 || 1st South West || Won Southern Conference Semifinal (Kentucky)Lost Southern Conference Championship (H-Town)
|-
| colspan="6" align="center" | Los Angeles Amazons (IWFL)
|-
|2009 || 8 || 0 || 0 || 1st Tier I West Pacific Southwest || Lost Western Conference Semifinal (Kansas City)
|-
|2010 || 4 || 4 || 0 || 5th Tier I West Pacific West || --
|-
| colspan="6" align="center" | Los Angeles Amazons (WFA)
|-
|2011 || 1 || 7 || 0 || 3rd American North Pacific || --
|-
|2012 || 0 || 8 || 0 || 3rd American Division 15 || --
|-
!Totals || 47 || 53 || 0
|colspan="2"| (including playoffs)

2009

Season schedule

2010

Season schedule

2011

Standings

Season schedule

** = Forfeited
*** = Won by forfeit

2012

Season schedule

References

External links
Los Angeles Amazons official website

Women's Football Alliance teams
Amazons
American football teams established in 2002
2002 establishments in California
Women's sports in California